is a former member of the Japanese idol girl group SKE48. She was a member of SKE48's Team E, and a former member of HKT48.

Career 
Kimoto passed SKE48's 4th generation auditions in September 2010. Her debut was on October 5, 2010. Her first senbatsu was for the single 1! 2! 3! 4! Yoroshiku!. On December 6, 2010, she was promoted to Team E.

In the 2012 general elections, Kimoto placed 56th with 5,982 votes. In 2013, she improved her rank to 31st with 21,385 votes. In 2014, she placed 50th with 16,022 votes.

In February 2014, during the AKB48 Group Shuffle, it was announced she would have a concurrent position in HKT48's Team KIV. On 26 March 2015, it was announced that her concurrent position in HKT48 would be canceled.

On October 27, 2017, she announced that she will graduate from the group during SKE48's performance, she graduated from the group on December 1, 2017.

On April 9, 2021, Kimoto announced her retirement from the entertainment industry. Her contract with Knockout Co.Ltd expired on May 31, 2021.

Discography

SKE48 singles

HKT48 singles

AKB48 singles

Appearances

Movies

 Shimajirō to Ehon no Kuni ni (2016) Kicky (voice)

Dramas
 Majisuka Gakuen 2 (2011)
 Majisuka Gakuen 3 (2012)

References

External links
 SKE48 Official Profile  
 Official Blog 
 Kanon Kimoto on Google+ 

1997 births
Living people
Japanese idols
Japanese women pop singers
Musicians from Aichi Prefecture
SKE48 members
HKT48 members